Lončarovci is a village in the Municipality of Moravske Toplice in the Prekmurje region of Slovenia.

There is a free-standing three-storey belfry in the middle of the village. It was built in the 1940s. The writer István Ballér was born in Lončarovci.

References

External links
Lončarovci on Geopedia

Populated places in the Municipality of Moravske Toplice